Michael Hurst (born 1957) is a New Zealand actor.

Michael Hurst may also refer to:

D. Michael Hurst Jr., Mississippi attorney
Michael Hurst (director), Australian director on Between Two Worlds (TV series) (2020)
Mike Hurst (politician) (born 1950), Canadian politician
Mike Hurst (producer) (born 1942), English musician and record producer

See also
Michael Hirst (disambiguation)